László Karácson (24 November 1918 – 1 May 2004) was a Hungarian modern pentathlete. He competed at the 1948 Summer Olympics.

References

External links
 

1918 births
2004 deaths
Hungarian male modern pentathletes
Olympic modern pentathletes of Hungary
Modern pentathletes at the 1948 Summer Olympics
Sportspeople from Budapest
20th-century Hungarian people
21st-century Hungarian people